Davide Rummolo (born 12 November 1977, in Naples) is an Italian swimmer who won the bronze medal in the 200 metres breaststroke at the 2000 Summer Olympics. In 2002 he became the European champion in the 200 m breaststroke.

References
 

1977 births
Swimmers from Naples
Living people
Italian male swimmers
Italian male breaststroke swimmers
Olympic swimmers of Italy
Swimmers at the 2000 Summer Olympics
Olympic bronze medalists for Italy
Olympic bronze medalists in swimming
European Aquatics Championships medalists in swimming
Medalists at the 2000 Summer Olympics
Universiade medalists in swimming
Mediterranean Games gold medalists for Italy
Mediterranean Games medalists in swimming
Swimmers at the 2001 Mediterranean Games
Universiade gold medalists for Italy
Medalists at the 2001 Summer Universiade
20th-century Italian people
21st-century Italian people